Biston regalis is a moth of the family Geometridae. It is found in China (Liaoning, Henan, Shaanxi, Gansu, Zhejiang, Hubei, Jiangxi, Hunan, Fujian, Hainan, Sichuan, Yunnan), Taiwan, Russia (Amur, Ussuri), Japan, North Korea, South Korea, India, Nepal, the Philippines, Pakistan and the United States.

Subspecies
Biston regalis regalis
Biston regalis comitata (Warren, 1899)

References

Moths described in 1888
Bistonini
Moths of Japan